During the 1999–2000 English football season, Carlisle United Football Club competed in the Football League Third Division where they finished in 23rd position narrowly avoiding relegation to the Football Conference by goal difference.

Season summary
Manager Nigel Pearson was sacked shortly after the end of the previous season, with chairman Michael Knighton publicly blaming the previous season's relegation battle on the 35-year-old's inexperience, and replacing him with Martin Wilkinson; an experienced coach, but one whose managerial experience only consisted of a short spell in charge of Peterborough United over a decade prior.

The change initially seemed to work well and produced a promising start to the season, only for this to be followed by a dismal run of just two wins in twenty-six attempts, plunging them straight into yet another fight against relegation. For the second season in a row, relegation to the Conference was avoided on the final day; while Carlisle lost their last game, Chester City also lost theirs, allowing Carlisle to survive by virtue of two goals. Ultimately, Carlisle's taking maximum points from their two fixtures over Chester would prove key to their survival; had they taken anything less than all six points from those two matches, Chester would have stayed in the Football League at their expense.

Final league table

Results
Carlisle United's score comes first

Legend

Football League Division Three

League Cup

FA Cup

Football League Trophy

Squad
Appearances for competitive matches only

References

Carlisle United 1999–2000 at soccerbase.com (use drop down list to select relevant season)

 11v11

See also
1999–2000 in English football

Carlisle United F.C. seasons
Carlisle United